Jarmaq (جرمق) is a village in the Jezzine District in southern Lebanon, located  southeast of the capital Beirut. It is situated at the lower, western ridge of Mount Meron, overlooking the Sea of Galilee. Its land area is 448 hectares.

History
The Syrian geographer Yaqut al-Hamawi (d. 1226) mentioned that Jarmaq was a district of Safed and the site of an ancient town by the same name. Yaqut notes a Hebrew tribe was called after the town.

In the 1596 tax records, it was named as a village, Jarman, in the Ottoman nahiya (subdistrict) of Shaqif Arnun, part of Safad Sanjak, with a population of 52 households and 6 bachelors, all Muslims. The villagers paid taxes on goats and beehives, "occasional revenues", a press for olive oil or grape syrup, "dulab", in addition to a fixed sum; a total of 5,502 akçe.

Jarmaq was a Druze village, which began to decline in the 1830s, with Edward Robinson calling it "almost deserted". In 1877 it was described as "a small, half-ruined village of stone" with thirty Druze inhabitants. The inhabitants emigrated to the Hauran in the following decade. Jarmaq is the ancestral village of the eponymous Jarmaqani family resident in modern Salkhad, al-Qurayya and Urman.

Following the 1982 invasion Jarmaq became part of the Israeli Security Zone. On 5 April 1992 Israeli soldiers shot dead two guerillas planting a roadside bomb in Jarmaq. Five Israeli soldiers had been killed in first 14 weeks of 1992.

References

Bibliography

External links
Jarmaq, Localiban
    
Populated places in Jezzine District
History of the Druze